The 30th National Hockey League All-Star Game was held at the Pacific Coliseum in Vancouver, home of the Vancouver Canucks, on January 25, 1977. Wales Conference All-Star team defeated the Campbell Conference for the third consecutive year. Rick Martin scored two goals in the third period including the game-winning goal with under two minutes to play, and was voted most valuable player.

Team Lineups

Game summary 

Goaltenders : 
 Wales  : Dryden (31:27 minutes), Desjardins (28:33 minutes).
 Campbell : Parent (31:27 minutes), Resch (27:41 minutes).

Shots on goal : 
Wales (36) 14 - 10 - 12
Campbell (25) 10 - 08 - 07

Referee : Bruce Hood

Linesmen : Matt Pavelich, Ron Finn

See also
1976–77 NHL season

References
 

All
National Hockey League All-Star Games
National Hockey League All-Star Game
National Hockey League All-Star Game